Ab Band may refer to:
Ab Band District, in Ghazni Province, Afghanistan
Āb Band, Ghazni, a village and the center of the above district in Ghazni Province, Afghanistan
Ab Band, Iran